Margriet Ehlen (born 28 September 1943) is a Dutch poet, composer, conductor and educator of classical music.

Life and career
Ehlen was born in Heerlen and has composed for a large variety of instruments, yet is particularly active in composition for voice. These works extend from solo vocalists to choir music. Many of her compositions for voice set poetry to music. To this end she has utilized texts by Gerrit Achterberg, Anna Bijns, Emily Dickinson, Wiel Kusters and Elly de Waard. She is also an accomplished and decorated poet herself.

She studied composition with Gerard Kockelmans, Willem de Vries Robbé and Robert Heppener, piano with Bart Berman and Kees Steinroth and choir conducting with Jan Eelkema. She graduated with a degree in music education from the Maastricht Academy of Music, and taught at teacher colleges in Rotterdam, Maastricht and Sittard.

She has collected and analyzed the works of her former teacher, the Dutch composer Gerard Kockelmans, and written about the composer Jean Lambrechts.

Many of her works were published by Donemus, a not-for-profit Dutch publishing house that promotes contemporary classical composers. Some others were published by the Rieks Sodenkamp publishing house in Maastricht.

Selected works
 1979 Cyclus I, five songs for voice and piano on poems Martin Boot
 1980 Three songs for voice and piano on texts by Martin Boot
 1984 Palimpseste, for songs on poems by Wiel Kusters for mezzo-soprano and piano
 1988 And send the Rose to you, ten songs for choir on texts by Emily Dickinson and Elly de Waard
 1988 Wijfken, staat oppe for soprano and flute/alt-flute on a text by Anna Bijnstriptiek
 1990 Euridyce, a cycle of seven songs for mezzo-soprano and flute quartet on texts by Gerrit Achterberg
 1990 Three small songs for flute and medium voice on poems by Hadewych Laugs
 1994 Dröm for soprano and flute on a text by Birgitta Buch
 1995 Prèsque Berceuse for soprano, flute and harpsichord or piano on a text by H. Leopold
 1995 Too few the mornings be, for soprano, saxophone, horn and piano
 2003 For the Distant, mini opera  for soprano, 2 percussion orchestras, 2 dancers, video, and 2 choirs
 2006 Ignis Caritas for carillon on a text by Margriet Ehlen
 2012 The Iron Lady of Maastricht on a text by Daan Doesborgh, counter tenor and saxophone

Awards
 1997 Peter Kempkens Literature Award
 1995-1999 Veldeke awards (4 prizes)

References

External links
 Margriet Ehlen at the Society of Limburg's Composers
 Margriet Ehlen at Rhegie

1943 births
Living people
20th-century classical composers
20th-century conductors (music)
20th-century Dutch women writers
20th-century women composers
20th-century women writers
21st-century classical composers
21st-century conductors (music)
21st-century women composers
Composers for carillon
Dutch classical composers
Dutch conductors (music)
Dutch women classical composers
Dutch women poets
Maastricht Academy of Music alumni
Musicians from Limburg (Netherlands)
People from Heerlen
Women conductors (music)